The telescope hornsnail, scientific name Pleurocera walkeri, is a species of freshwater snail with an operculum, an aquatic gastropod mollusk in the family Pleuroceridae. This species is endemic to the USA.

References 

Molluscs of the United States
Pleuroceridae
Taxa named by Edwin Stephen Goodrich
Taxonomy articles created by Polbot